Chemancheri railway station (Code:CMC) is a monument of India's freedom struggle and the station serving the historical town of Kappad in the Kozhikode district of Kerala, India. It lies in the Shoranur–Mangalore section of the Southern Railways.  Trains halting at the station connect the town to prominent cities in India such as Thiruvananthapuram, Kochi, Chennai, Kollam, Bangalore, Kozhikode, Kannur, Coimbatore, Mangalore, Mysore and so forth.

References

Railway stations in Kozhikode district
Palakkad railway division